Al-Yarmouk Sports Club is a Syrian professional basketball club based in Aleppo. As of 2021, 8 other types of sports are being practiced by the Al-Yarmouk SC. The club is part of the sports and scouting organization Homenetmen.

History

The club was founded in 1925 by the Armenians of Syria under the name Homenetmen. It plays its home matches in the Al-Yarmouk Sports Arena.

The club's best recent position in the SBL is 3rd place from 2015 and eighth place from 2019 seasons.

In the 2021 season, the team finished in 12th place with only one city derby win with their rival Ouroube SC and relegated to the 2nd Division.

Honours
Syrian Basketball League
Third place (1): 2015
Fourth place (1): 2009 
Sixth place (1): 2004
Eighth place (1): 2019

Past rosters
2010-2011 season:

See also
Syrian Basketball League
Homenetmen Beirut (basketball)

References

External links
Official page

Basketball teams in Syria
Sport in Aleppo
Basketball teams established in 1925
Sport in Syria